Zak Penn (born March 23, 1968) is an American screenwriter. Penn wrote and directed Incident at Loch Ness and The Grand, wrote the script for The Incredible Hulk, co-wrote the scripts for X2, X-Men: The Last Stand, and the story for The Avengers. With Michael Karnow, Penn is the co-creator of the TV series Alphas on the Syfy network.

Early life
Penn was born in New York. He is the son of New York businessman and lawyer Arthur Penn, who led the acquisition of the Capital Markets Assurance Corporation from Citicorp.

Zak Penn graduated from Wesleyan University in 1990. His screenplay for PCU was based on his experiences at the Eclectic Society house.

Career

Films that Penn has been involved in writing include Last Action Hero, X2, X-Men: The Last Stand, and Elektra. Penn wrote early drafts of Hulk, The Incredible Hulk,  The Avengers and Free Guy.

Penn is also a jury member for the digital studio Filmaka, a platform for undiscovered filmmakers to show their work to industry professionals.

In July 2012, Avatar Press released the first issue of Penn's first comic book, Hero Worship. The six-issue series is co-written with Star Wars: The Clone Wars screenwriter Scott Murphy and drawn by Michael DiPascale. It centers on Zenith, an indestructible hero who has fans following every disaster, trying to catch a glimpse of the ultimate celebrity and risking their own lives in the process. One fan becomes so obsessed that it leads to the development of his own powers.

He directed the documentary film Atari: Game Over.

Filmography

Films

Television

Video games

References

External links

 Interview with Zak Penn at IFC.com

1968 births
American male screenwriters
Screenwriters from New York (state)
Wesleyan University alumni
American film directors
American film producers
Living people